Ángel Gregorio López Solórzano (born February 19, 1996) is a Mexican professional footballer who plays as a midfielder for Tapatío on loan from Guadalajara.

Career
He made his official debut under Argentine coach Matias Almeyda against Tigres UANL in the 2017 Campeon de Campeones Final on 16 July 2017.

Loan at Zacatepec 
On 14 December 2017 López was loaned to Club Atlético Zacatepec.

Notes

References

External links
 
 Ángel Gregorio López at Chivas de Corazon
 

1996 births
Living people
Mexican footballers
Mexican expatriate footballers
C.D. Guadalajara footballers
Club Atlético Zacatepec players
CD Tudelano footballers
Liga MX players
Segunda División B players
Association football midfielders
Mexican expatriate sportspeople in Spain
Expatriate footballers in Spain